The Explorers Club are an American pop rock band originally from the coast of South Carolina, United States.  They feature a rotating cast of musicians led by Jason Brewer, whose debut album was released by Dead Oceans.  The music of their first album is heavily influenced by the vocal harmony styles and production of The Beach Boys. They are also influenced by classic rock and roll arrangements as made popular by The Beatles, Chuck Berry, Phil Spector, The Zombies, The Monkees and The Byrds. Their second album shows more influences of soft-pop artists of the early-1970s such as Burt Bacharach, Glen Campbell, etc.  The band relocated to Nashville, Tenn. in 2014 and released their third studio album 'Together' on 24 June 2016. On 12 June 2020 they released the self-titled album 'The Explorers Club' and an album of covers titled 'To Sing and Be Born Again' on Goldstar Recordings.

History
The Explorers Club was formed in Charleston, South Carolina in 2005.  The group signed with indie record label Dead Oceans in June 2007 and released their debut album in 2008.  Their first single, "Do You Love Me?", was released in April of that year.  The Explorers Club's music has been featured on TV shows such as The O.C., How I Met Your Mother, and  Bored to Death. Several members of The Explorers Club were previously in a band called 1984. To promote the February 2012 release of Grand Hotel, the band released three free EPs called "suites", each containing a cover and two preliminary mixes of tracks set to appear on the album. The final mixes for the album were done by Mark Linett, who is known for his work with The Beach Boys. In 2014 and 2015, the band recorded their third studio album, Together, at Reel Recording in Nashville, Tenn. The album featured members of Brian Wilson's band, Nelson Bragg, Probyn Gregory, Scott Bennett, and Darian Sahanaja, and was co-produced by Jason Brewer, Mark Galup, and Erik Thompson. Together was released on 24 June 2016.

Discography

Albums
 Freedom Wind - Dead Oceans, 2008
 Grand Hotel - Rock Ridge Music, 2012
 TOGETHER - Goldstar Recordings, 2016
 The Explorers Club - Goldstar Recordings, 2020
 To Sing and Be Born Again - Goldstar Recordings, 2020
 Wattage - Goldstar Recordings, 2021

EPs
 The Explorers Club - self-released, iTunes, 2006
 The Californian Suite - Rock Ridge Music, 2011
 The Carolinian Suite - Rock Ridge Music, 2011
 The New Yorker Suite - Rock Ridge Music, 2011
 All Aboard: Live at Patriots Point, 2015

Singles
 Do You Love Me? / Carry Me - Dead Oceans, 2008
 In 2012 the band recorded a version of Don't Pull Your Love for a fund raising cd titled "Super Hits of the Seventies" for radio station WFMU.
 No Good to Cry, 2012
 Don't Waste Her Time, Burger Records, 2013
 Christmas Must Be Tonight, 2013
 We've Only Just Begun, 2014
 The Sun Ain't Gonna Shine Anymore, 2019

Press
 Spin online:  Artist of the Day 03.07.08 .

References

External links
 Band Website

American pop rock music groups
Musical groups from South Carolina
Musical groups established in 2005
Musicians from Charleston, South Carolina
Dead Oceans artists